Xystophora mongolica is a moth of the family Gelechiidae. It was described by Emelyanov and Piskunov in 1982. It is found in Mongolia and Russia.

References

Moths described in 1982
Xystophora